Rhynchalastor is a moderately large afrotropical genus of potter wasps with 25 species currently known. Some authorities expand the genus to include species otherwise classified under related genera such as Stenodynerus

Species
Some of the Afrotropical species classified under Rhynchalastor are listed below:

Rhynchalastor auratipennis (Giordani Soika, 1934)
Rhynchalastor auratus (Fabricius, 1787)
Rhynchalastor baidoensis (Giordani Soika, 1944)
Rhynchalastor bairstowi (Gribodo, 1892)
Rhynchalastor bensoni (Giordani Soika, 1934)
Rhynchalastor captiosus (Giordani Soika, 1989)
Rhynchalastor carinatus (Gusenleitner, 2006)
Rhynchalastor caudalis (Giordani Soika, 1934)
Rhynchalastor corvus (Meade-Waldo, 1915)
Rhynchalastor ferruginatus (Bequaert, 1918)
Rhynchalastor flavofasciatellus (Giordani Soika, 1940)
Rhynchalastor flavofasciatus (Gusenleitner, 2006)
Rhynchalastor flavotorquatus (Giordani Soika, 1940)
Rhynchalastor fuscipennis (Meade-Waldo, 1910)
Rhynchalastor histrionimimus (Bequaert, 1918)
Rhynchalastor imitator (Giordani Soika, 1983)
Rhynchalastor indotatus (Giordani Soika, 1934)
Rhynchalastor kolensis (Giordani Soika, 1934)
Rhynchalastor luteatus(Gusenleitner, 2006)
Rhynchalastor lutra (Giordani Soika, 1934)
Rhynchalastor miserrimus (Giordani Soika, 1934)
Rhynchalastor occidentalis (Giordani Soika, 1989)
Rhynchalastor politiclypeus (von Schulthess, 1914)
Rhynchalastor rhizophorarum (Bequaert, 1918)
Rhynchalastor sorex (Gusenleitner, 2006)
Rhynchalastor xanthosoma (Schletterer, 1891)

References

Biological pest control wasps
Potter wasps
Taxa named by Edmund Meade-Waldo